In geometry, the medial pentagonal hexecontahedron is a nonconvex isohedral polyhedron. It is the dual of the snub dodecadodecahedron. It has 60 intersecting irregular pentagonal faces.

Proportions

Each face has one medium length edge, two short and two long ones.
,
and the long edges have length
.
The dihedral angle equals . The other real zero of the polynomial  plays a similar role for the medial inverted pentagonal hexecontahedron.

References

External links 
 
 Uniform polyhedra and duals

Dual uniform polyhedra